Jo Anne Lyon (born 1940 in Blackwell, Oklahoma) is the Vice President of Wesley Seminary in Marion, Indiana. Lyon was previously the General Superintendent of the Wesleyan Church . Lyon was elected as the first woman General Superintendent at the June 2008 General Conference. In 2012 she was elected as the only General Superintendent of the denomination. Lyon was ordained as a minister in the Wesleyan Church in 1996 the same year that she founded World Hope International, an organization desiring to alleviate suffering and injustice through education, enterprise and community health.

Lyon holds a bachelor's degree in education from the University of Cincinnati, a Masters in Counseling from The University of Missouri-Kansas City and further graduate work at St. Louis University in Historical Theology. She has been awarded an honorary Doctor of Divinity from Northeastern Seminary and United Wesleyan College and an honorary Doctor of Humane Letters from both Southern Wesleyan University and Indiana Wesleyan University.

References

External links

Talks at Trinity Evangelical Divinity School

1940 births
Living people
American clergy
University of Cincinnati alumni
Southern Wesleyan University alumni
Wesleyan Methodists
20th-century Methodists